Miska the Magnate (Hungarian: Mágnás Miska) is a 1916 Hungarian silent comedy film directed by Alexander Korda and starring Lili Berky, Victor Varconi and Alajos Mészáros. It was based on a popular stage musical comedy by Károly Bakoni and Andor Gábor. The play was later turned into the 1949 film Mickey Magnate.

Cast
Lili Berky as Marcsa  
Victor Varconi as Baracs 
Alajos Mészáros   
Jenő Horváth   
Amália Jákó   
Marcsa Simon   
Imre Szirmai
Éva Örkényi

References

Bibliography

External links

Hungarian silent films
Hungarian comedy films
Films directed by Alexander Korda
Hungarian films based on plays
Hungarian black-and-white films
Austro-Hungarian films
1916 comedy films